Saint Sava Serbian Orthodox Parish (Winnipeg) is part of the Serbian Orthodox Eparchy of Canada, a diocese of the Serbian Orthodox Church. It is located at 580 Talbot Avenue in Winnipeg, Manitoba.

History
At the turn of the 20th century the Royal government of the Kingdom of Serbia took an interest in Serbian diaspora. During the height of the Great War, Helen Losanitch Frothingham who at the behest of the Serbian government came to visit the Canadian Prairies while on her way to Vancouver and Victoria. She stayed a few days at the Royal Alexander Hotel in Winnipeg. Winnipeg Serbs attended the lecture given by Losanitch-Frothingham about the conditions in war-torn Serbia and neighboring lands where Serbs were subjected to conscription in the military of the non-British Allied nations. After the talk, the Serbian anthem was played and a collection for Serbian Relief was taken. Later, in her diary, she wrote about leaving "Winnipeg Monday evening" by train and reaching "Toronto at 4 P.M. Wednesday", a long two-night journey and more.

Another Serbian speaker, retired diplomat Čedomilj Mijatović accompanied by one of the most famous British suffragettes, Emmeline Pankhurst visited the United States of America and Canada, particularly the Canadian Prairies and British Columbia. With such a well-known person, crowds came to Mijatović's lectures and enabled him to have well-attended lectures and to give interviews to the leading dailies. The dire situation in the Balkans spurred recruitment of Canadian doctors for civilian practice in Serbia while local doctors served in the Serbian Army

Some fifty Serbian families lived in Winnipeg and neighboring St. Boniface at the outbreak of World War I, though not many in number but just as significant as any ethnic pioneer community in the Canadian West at the time.

From 1920 to the start of the Second World War, Serbian immigrants began to arrive from the breakup of Austrian Empire (Hungary, Bosnia, Romania) and Ottoman Empire (Kosovo, Macedonia) in an increasing number that would slowly swell the Winnipeg Serbian population.

World War II
The next big wave of immigrants came after the war with the arrival of Serbian émigrés who fought under General Dragoljub Mihailovich to the Dominion of Canada. Attracting them to Winnipeg was a branch of the Serbian National Defense Council in existence since its fledgling beginnings. Although they were in a national political sense united, they desired to have a religious organization.

In all the years after World War II, the Serbs of Winnipeg would ask a Russian priest to officiate in a rented, old wooden Eastern Orthodox Church in St. Boniface, the Indian and Metis suburb of Winnipeg. When the heritage building was sold, the Serbian community bought a Church building from the Presbyterians in 1967 even though they were without a parish priest. No improvements occurred until Bishop Sava (Vuković), on his way to Vancouver, accompanied by Rev, Vladimir Milinković and Protodeacon Dr. Nedeljko Grgurević visited the small community. Bishop Sava held a meeting with the local Serbs regarding the formation of a Church-School Congregation and Parish. Father Bogdan Zjalić visited Winnipeg on 18 March 1972 and upon his suggestion, the community center was transformed into a Church-School Congregation. Rev. Zjalić sent a membership list with a petition for the formation of a Church School Congregation and Parish to Bishop Sava (Vuković) for approval. The Church in Winnipeg was consecrated by Bishop Sava on Palm Sunday 1974 and Rev. Srboljub Jocković was appointed parish priest. later, the parish bought a building at Atlantic Avenue and adapted it into a Church. In addition to Father Srbojub Jocković, the following priests served in the parish: Živorad Gavrilović, Syngelos Nikodim Pribojan, Božo Bakajlić, Živorad Subotić, Vitomir Kostić, Slavisa Lekić, Mališa Milovanović.

During the start of the breakup of the former Yugoslavia, difficult times were endured by the Serbs in Winnipeg as well as the communities across the country. There were curious happenings, incidents when humanitarian aid was not directed towards humans from fear of taking sides. Yet everything imaginable was endured, forgotten, and forgiven according to the teachings of the Serbian Orthodox Church.

Bibliography
 Helen Losanitch Frothingham: Mission for Serbia: Letters from America and Canada, 915-1920, published by Walker (1970), page 154.
 Jim Blanchard: Winnipeg's Great War: A City Comes of Age (2010), page 216

References 

Serbian Orthodox Church in Canada
Winnipeg dioceses